Aeneas was a Trojan hero in Virgil's Aeneid and Homer's Iliad.

Aeneas may also refer to:

Biblical or mythological characters
 Aeneas (biblical figure), a paralyzed man cured by Saint Peter in the Acts of the Apostles
 Aeneas Silvius, mythological king of Alba Longa

People
 Aeneas Tacticus (fl. 4th century BC), Greek military writer
 Aeneas of Gaza (died c. 518), philosopher
 Aeneas of Paris (died 870), Bishop of Paris
 Aeneas de Caprara (1631–1701), Austrian field marshal
 Æneas Munson (1734–1826), American physician and Yale Medical School professor
 Æneas Shaw (c. 1740–1814), soldier and politician of Upper Canada
 Aeneas Chisholm (vicar apostolic) (1759–1818), Scottish Roman Catholic bishop
 Aeneas Coffey (1780–1852), inventor of the Coffey still
 Aeneas Chisholm (bishop of Aberdeen) (1836–1918), Scottish Roman Catholic bishop
 Æneas Baron Mackay (1839–1909), Prime Minister of the Netherlands
 Aeneas Mackintosh (1879–1916), Antarctic explorer and British merchant navy officer
 Aeneas Gallant (1882–1971), Canadian farmer, merchant and politician
 Æneas MacKenzie (1889–1962), Hollywood screenwriter
Æneas John McIntyre (1821–1889), British politician
 Aeneas Chigwedere (born 1939), Zimbabwean politician
 Aeneas Williams (born 1968), American National Football League player

Places
 Aeneas, Washington, an unincorporated area in the American state of Washington
Aeneas, an impact crater of Saturn's moon Dione

Ships
 HMS Aeneas (P427), Royal Navy submarine
 Aeneas (troopship), a ship owned by the British government and wrecked in 1805

Other uses
 Aeneas Internet and Telephone, a telecommunications provider serving the state of Tennessee
 Aeneas, a GNU software package substituted by GNU Archimedes in May 
 Parides aeneas, a species of butterfly in the family Papilionidae

See also
 1172 Äneas, a Jupiter trojan asteroid
 Aenea (disambiguation)
 Pope Pius II (1405–1464), born Enea Silvio Piccolomini (in Latin Aeneas Sylvius)
 Enéas Carneiro (1938–2007), Brazilian politician